Jukkapant Punpee (Thai  จักรพันธ์ ปั่นปี) is a Thai former footballer and He is the currently team coaching staff of Thai League 2 club Uthaithani.

Managerial statistics

Honours

International

Thailand U23
 Sea Games: 2001  Gold
 Asian Games: 2002 (Fourth place)

References

1979 births
Living people
Jukkapant Punpee
Footballers at the 2002 Asian Games
Southeast Asian Games medalists in football
Jukkapant Punpee
Association football defenders
Competitors at the 2001 Southeast Asian Games
Jukkapant Punpee
Jukkapant Punpee